AC Sparta Praha is a Czech cycling team recognized by the UCI since 2002: it started as a third division team, then becoming a Continental team, and a club team in 2021.

Team roster

Major wins 

2003
Stage 2 Ringerike GP, Richard Faltus
Prologue & Stage 1 Bohemia Tour, Richard Faltus
2008
Overall Tour of Szeklerland, Martin Hebík
Prologue & Stage 2, Martin Hebík
Stage 1, Rostislav Krotký
2009
Stage 6 Tour de Serbie, Nebojša Jovanović
GP Bradlo, Nebojša Jovanović
2013
Stage 7 Rás Tailteann, Tomáš Okrouhlický

References

External links

UCI Continental Teams (Europe)
Cycling teams based in the Czech Republic
Cycling teams established in 2002
AC Sparta Prague
Sport in Prague